Triple candlestick may refer to:

 A general form of candlestick
 Triple candlestick (Catholic Church), a triple candlestick used in Catholic liturgy
 Trikirion, a triple candlestick used in Eastern Orthodox and Byzantine Catholic liturgy
 Paschal trikirion, a trikirion only used for Easter
 A candelabra with three branches
 Some complex candlestick patterns, in financial analysis

See also 
 Altar candle
 Candle holder (disambiguation)
 Candlestick (disambiguation)